Ambalamidera II is a town and commune in Madagascar. It belongs to the Isandra district, which is a part of Haute Matsiatra Region. The population of the commune was 5,460 in 2018

Primary and junior level secondary education are available in town. The majority 99% of the population of the commune are farmers.  The most important crops are rice and beans, while other important agricultural products are maize, cassava and sweet potatoes. Services provide employment for 1% of the population.

References and notes 

Populated places in Haute Matsiatra